Lucknow is a locality in the Central West region of New South Wales, Australia, on the Mitchell Highway and adjacent to the regional centre of Orange.

Heritage listings 
Lucknow has a number of heritage-listed sites, including: 
 4570-4578 Mitchell Highway: Wentworth and Reform Gold Mines

References

External links

Towns in New South Wales
City of Orange
Mining towns in New South Wales